Kittleson is a surname. Notable people with the surname include:

Drew Kittleson (born 1989), American golfer
Isaac Milo Kittleson (1874–1958), American politician
Mark Kittleson (born 1952), American health educator
Travis Kittleson (born 1979), American stock car racing driver